Shin Megami Tensei: Devil Survivor 2 is a tactical role-playing game in the Megami Tensei series developed by Atlus for the Nintendo DS. It is a sequel to the 2009 Nintendo DS role-playing game Shin Megami Tensei: Devil Survivor. It was released in Japan in July 2011, in North America in February 2012, and in Europe in October 2013. An enhanced version for the Nintendo 3DS, titled Shin Megami Tensei: Devil Survivor 2 Record Breaker, was released in 2015.

The setting of Devil Survivor 2 spans the whole country of Japan. It tells the story of Japanese high school students who enter a pact, enabling them to summon demons and fight mysterious creatures invading and destroying the country. The plot may unfold differently depending on the player's actions who assumes the role of a silent young demon tamer involved in this incident. The game is a tactical role-playing which takes after its predecessor as it involves controlling several demon tamers in their fights against different enemies and gaining new skills in the process. It has new additions such as the Fate System where the player can relate with other cast as well as the upgradeable racial skills.

The game was designed to bring several improvements to the original Devil Survivor. It received positive critical reception by video game publications which praised the story and improvements over its predecessor but criticized the game's high difficulty and lack of innovation. It has sold a total of 106,000 units. The game also received two manga series, as well as an anime television adaptation by Studio Bridge, Devil Survivor 2: The Animation, which aired in Japan between April and June 2013.

Gameplay

Devil Survivor 2 is a tactical role-playing game. Like in the previous Devil Survivor game, in combat situations, the player  takes on the role of a young demon tamer and is free to interact with other characters at the cost of time going by or to engage in free battles that do not make time continue. In fights with the computer opponent to defeat enemies and satisfy certain objectives such as helping other characters, while avoiding conditions that will end the mission in failure. In three versus three battle phase, the battle is presented in first-person and traditional turn-based battles, player controls one human and two demons, allowing the player to select one action for each squad member, and the computer doing the same for its squad; combat is then resolved after this selection. Players can get their "Extra Turn" or "Double Extra" in the battle if the player has attacked the enemy's weaknesses or launched critical attacks, and when a leader's health become zero, the battle ends. Also, the player can crack enemy skills. Once cracked, the player can assign these skills across all of their parties' human characters. In addition to demon fusion, the player can acquire new demons, up to 24 in total, by attempting to win demon auctions using the Macca collected in battle.

Outside battle, the player can explore the country or save their game. Devil Survivor 2 has a new feature called the "Fate System". The player can develop relationships with other characters, starting at Rank 0. The stronger the relationship, the more that character becomes effective in battle, can share the same skillcracks, and also unlocking certain demon fusions. In the sixth day of the game, the player must choose an available ending, which the player can unlock by answering some questions from the other characters or help them during battle.

Plot

Setting and characters
The game takes place in several parts of Japan that are facing destruction at the hands of the demons. The cast features a young silent character whose thoughts and actions are decided by the player. He is initially accompanied by his best friend Daichi Shijima, and the apologetic girl Io Nitta. The three are found by a woman named Makoto Sako, a member of the secret government organization JP's which is led by the young Yamato Hotsuin. There, they meet Fumi Kanno; a scientist who leads JP's Nagoya branch, Hinako Kujou, a carefree dancer, Keita Wakui, a young boxer who is obsessed with getting stronger, Jungo Torii, a sturdy and quiet chef, Airi Ban, a lively girl, Otome Yanagiya, a physician in charge of JP's Osaka Branch, Yuzuru "Joe" Akie, a salary man, and Ronaldo Kuriki, a detective who opposes JP's. Throughout the story the protagonist also meets the mysterious young man simply known as the Anguished One.

Story
Devil Survivor 2 begins with the Protagonist and his friend, Daichi, returning from a mock exam, along with their classmate Io. The three of them receive an email on their cellphones from Nicaea, a website that forewarns its users of the death of a friend. The email contains a video showing them dying from a freak subway accident. Immediately after, the scene is enacted, but the students survive after being contacted by an avatar from Nicaea. As soon as they enable the applications on their cellphone, more demons appear and attack them. The Protagonist, along with Daichi and Io, defeat the demons and become Demon Tamers, allowing them to summon demons to use to fight along them after fulfilling a contract with them.

After escaping the subway, they come in contact with a non-demon creature labeled as Dubhe which kills humans. As they manage to defeat it with their demons, the group meets a secret organization called JP's led by the 17-year-old Yamato Hotsuin, who reveals to them that Japan, and maybe the entire world, is being ravaged by a group of creatures called the Septentriones, their collective being named after the stars in the Big Dipper constellation with Dubhe being one of them. The Protagonist's team then join JP's effort to defeat the Septentriones and prevent them from destroying the defense system designed by JP's to protect the few remaining Japanese cities that were not completely destroyed by that time, including Tokyo, Osaka, Nagoya and their neighboring prefectures. While confronting the Septentriones and gathering allies, the Protagonist is frequently forewarned with videos of his companions' imminent deaths, and must find ways to prevent them in time, with the risk of losing them permanently if he fails.  Another hindrance comes in the figure of Ronaldo Kuriki, who leads a faction of rebel Summoners who oppose JP's methods.

The protagonist then meets an enigmatic figure introducing himself as "The Anguished One", who created the Devil Summoning program to help them fight their fated deaths. The Protagonist then learns that the Septentriones are trying to destroy Japan's barriers, resulting in the appearance of the Void, an unknown black substance that is swallowing the cities. According to Yamato, the Septentriones are actually trials sent by its leader Polaris who plans to destroy the mankind. The Anguished One further reveals Polaris is a divine entity that controls the fate of multiple parallel worlds and that rather than deleting the world it can recreate it. Once all Septentriones are defeated, Polaris will appear to mankind and listen to their will.

Following the defeat of the sixth Septentrione, Mizar, and under the threat of impending doom after the Dragon Stream that protected the JP's-held cities was taken offline in order to defeat it, the Protagonist's companions are divided between three factions, one led by Yamato who dreams of using Polaris to create a meritocratic society, with each individual's worth based on his/her achievements; one led by Ronaldo who envisions an egalitarian society with no distinctions between individuals; and one envisioning Daichi's ideal of a third option with everyone cooperating for the sake of a brighter future. The Protagonist must choose between supporting one of the factions or no faction at all, convincing the Anguished One to help him destroy Polaris and ensure mankind would freely choose its own future without external interference, or gathering all the factions to unite and restore the world. After making his decision, the Protagonist must defeat the other factions in battle or convince them to join his cause.

In the meantime they fight the last Septentrione revealed as the Anguished One, Alcor. After defeating the other branches, the protagonist's group fights Polaris and following their victory, the world changes depending on the path chosen. If the player follows Yamato or Ronaldo, they convince Polaris to reshape the world to their desired image. If the player follows Daichi, they either convince Polaris to restore the world to the day before the invasion or assassinate Polaris and return to rebuild the now ruined world. If the player follows the Anguished One, they kill Polaris and install the Anguished One as the new Administrator of humanity, and he repairs the world.

Development
Shin Megami Tensei: Devil Survivor 2 was published and developed by Atlus who first announced it in the magazine Famitsu in March 2011. Its director Shinjiro Takada said all of its predecessor's gameplay features were upgraded so that players would notice the improvements. He also expected players to clear the game several times. The human characters were handled by Suzuhito Yasuda, while the demons were designed by Kazuma Kaneko and the Septentrions monsters were created by manga artist Mohiro Kitoh.

Devil Survivor 2 was released in North America on February 28, 2012 by Atlus. For the European release, Ghostlights announced in April 2012 they would handle it. However, it was delayed with the company claiming "the market for DS games is quite difficult at the moment." In February 2012, Ghostlights revealed they were intending to do a limited run printing of Devil Survivor 2. The company had now set a target of 1,800 pre-orders before August 30, 2013. If the target was reached by then, the game should have been released by the end of September 2013 and the game was released in October from the same year. By September 2013, the target was reached.

Following the popularity of the game, just like its predecessor, the art book of the game is released in June 2011 named Devil Survivor 2 Official Design Works. The art book contains account of how the story unfolds, concept art and profiles of the characters, designs of the Septentriones, environment art, all of the endings with miniature screenshots, and other game specific information.

Music
The music of Devil Survivor 2 was composed by Kenji Ito, who is better known for his role in the SaGa series, and the Atlus sound team (Kenichi Tsuchiya, Atsushi Kitajoh, Ryota Kozuka, and Toshiki Konishi). An original soundtrack composed of thirty-five themes was released on August 24, 2011. Another "Special Soundtrack" was released on March 23, 2014. The game's opening theme is "World of Illusions" by Kinuco Saga.

The music of Devil Survivor 2: Record Breaker contains arrangements from the original game, along with new compositions by Shoji Meguro. An arranged soundtrack featuring four of Meguro's new tracks for the game was included as a pre-order bonus in both Japan and North America. Devil Survivor 2: Record Breaker Original Soundtrack was released on July 22, 2015.

Remake
An enhanced port of the game, was announced in March 2013 for the Nintendo 3DS. Its scenario, Triangulum Arc is set after the original Devil Survivor 2 ending and is accessible from the beginning of the game. It follows a new demon invasion as well as a new character associated with JP's. Citing quality issues, the game's release date was delayed from Fall 2013 to January 2015. It includes characters from Durarara!! as downloadable content along with a survival missions, Beginner's Map, and Paid Maps.

Triangulum Arc 
The events of the Triangulum Arc are set after the last day of the Septentrione Arc. The arc follows an ideal route not found in the original game, where the Protagonist joins Daichi and recruits everyone, but eventually also recruits the Anguished One into helping them kill Polaris. After Polaris' defeat, the Anguished One uses the Heavenly Throne to reset the world by accessing the old data within the Akashic Record and bring them back before the events of the game.

On Tuesday, Daichi introduces the Protagonist and Io to Nicaea ver.2.0. After school, during a concert by Airi and Hinako at the Sky Tower, the group receives a death clip of themselves. Just as the concert begins, the event shown in the death clip occurs as a creature that resembles the Septentriones suddenly appears above the Sky Tower and attacks. Using Nicaea, the Protagonist summons demons and restores his friends' memories of their previous battles, averting their death. Meeting Makoto and Otome, they find out that the creature that has attacked them is Denebola, one of three new invaders, the Triangulum. Unlike Polaris and the Septentriones, the Triangulum have been sent to destroy mankind completely. They also learn that Yamato apparently does not exist in this world, having been replaced as the leader of JP's by a girl named Miyako Hotsuin, and that the Anguished One's whereabouts are unknown. The party rerecruits Airi and Hinako and defeats Denebola, who is captured by Miyako. They agree to work with her in exchange for her cooperation in locating their old friends and protection for their families. Miyako orders them not to confront the Triangulum.

That night, all of the party members except the Protagonist have a nightmare in which they are all killed by the third Triangulum, Arcturus, except Yamato and the Anguished One, who barely defeat it, and the Protagonist, who is not present. The Protagonist then reunites with Jungo, Keita, Joe, and Ronaldo. While fighting the second Triangulum Spica's buds, the Protagonist's body starts to sporadically disappear. The Protagonist and his friends start to get suspicious of Miyako's intentions after discovering Denebola's core imprisoned inside the lab beneath JP's Osaka base. Their suspicions are furthered when Miyako also captures Spica before the Protagonist can kill it. With Fumi's aid, they sneak into an underground lab beneath the Sky Tower where they find the Anguished One imprisoned in a catatonic state. Miyako catches and arrests them, but they are saved by Otome and Makoto. The group defects from JP's and storms the Nagoya branch to use as a base of operations. They then sneak back into Tokyo and briefly awaken the Anguished One, who reveals that Yamato is alive at the Akasha Stratum and that they have fought Arcturus before. Since Yamato's Dragon Stream power is necessary to free the Anguished One, the party goes to the Akasha Stratum to bring back Yamato after receiving his death clip.

Reuniting with Yamato, he reveals that the world they are in is actually the third world. When they first reset the world, the Triangulum appeared and attacked the Protagonist's data at the Akashic Record, erasing him from existence. The nightmare they  experienced is actually a memory of the second world, in which they were all killed by Arcturus. Yamato and the Anguished One once again reset the world, but Yamato remained at the Akasha Stratum to prevent the Triangulum's continuous attacks on the Protagonist's data using the recovery system, the Astrolabe, preventing the Protagonist from disappearing in the third world and resulting in his sporadic disappearances. After the party defeats Arcturus, Miyako reveals that she intends to sacrifice the party to transfer the Administrative Authority they gained from Polaris' defeat to the Anguished One, making him the official Administrator of the human world. If the player accepts her proposal, as explained in the game's other routes, her actions buy humanity 2,000 years of peace before the next Administrator, who outranks the Anguished One, arrives, overthrows him, and destroys humanity. If the player refuses to cooperate, the Protagonist and his friends fight Miyako, who then reveals herself as the fourth Triangulum, Cor Caroli. Defeating her, Miyako reveals that everything that happened has been caused by her creator, Canopus, an administrator like Polaris whose job is to fix "errors" that occur within the Akashic Record. The creation of the Triangulum was a response to the first reset of the world, as with the destruction of Polaris, the Akashic Record was left without a proper administrator, causing Canopus to decide that humanity was too dangerous and needed to be destroyed. The party convinces Miyako to join them and destroy Canopus.

After defeating Canopus, the Protagonist is given three choices of what to do with the world. If Ronaldo's suggestion is chosen, the party resets the world with the intention of battling all Administrators until they are either destroyed or give up trying to destroy humanity. If the Anguished One's suggestion is chosen, the protagonist sacrifices his humanity to become an Administrator, returning peace to the human world. If Yamato's suggestion is chosen, the party creates a new world free of the Akashic Record so invaders will cease to exist altogether in the new world at the cost of being unable to reset the world again as well as losing both the Anguished One and Miyako (unless the Protagonist has fully befriended them, in which case they will be reincarnated as ordinary humans).

Media

Manga 

Following the game's popularity, Devil Survivor 2 -Show Your Free Will- was given a manga adaptation. It is written by Nagako Sakaki, the artist for Devil Survivor 2's manga, and started serialization in Earth Star Entertainment's magazine Comic Earth Star in September 12, 2011. Another manga is also in serialization but as part of the animated adaptation media. A light novel focused on Yamato Hotsuin was also published.

Anime

An anime television series based on the game aired on MBS between April 5, 2013 and June 28, 2013 and was simulcast by Crunchyroll. It was produced by Studio Bridge and directed by Seiji Kishi who also directed the anime adaptation of Persona 4. Makoto Uezu is in charge of the scripts, with Kotaro Nakagawa responsible for the soundtrack.  The series began release on DVD and Blu-ray volumes beginning June 19, 2013, with the first volume including the first episode as well a bonus CD containing the series' original soundtrack volume 1. Following volumes will each contain two episodes and as yet unknown bonus CD offerings. The anime was licensed on DVD by Sentai Filmworks in North America, MVM Entertainment in the United Kingdom, and Hanabee Entertainment in Australia. The opening theme is "Take Your Way" by Livetune feat. Fukase whilst the ending theme is "Be" by Song Riders.

Reception

The game was generally well-received, garnering an aggregate score of 79/100 on Metacritic, based on twenty-one reviews. Although the depth and quality of the battle system and story were praised, the game was criticized for being unfairly difficult at times. Heidi Kemps from GameSpot praised the consequences of the player's actions and commented that "Devil Survivor 2 is a great game. Combat is strategy-laden and engaging; amassing and preparing your demon companions is loads of fun; and the story is filled with memorable characters and set pieces that keep your eyes glued to the dual screens." RPGamer's Mike Moehnke the stated that "Devil Survivor 2 remains an addictive experience for a large chunk of its length." Gaming Age writer Dustin Chadwell praised the story as he viewed the Devil Survivor 2 cast more likeable than the ones from the first game which had a great influence in liking the game due to the story's impact in enjoying it but he would have preferred if Atlus had given the gameplay more additions to make the game more innovative.

The Fate System was well received for helping in the characterizing the cast members by RPGamer although RPGFan found it often "almost devolves into a quasi-dating-sim" due to the choices the player has to make in order to increase the points. Dale North from Destructoid noted how the Fate System appeared to be influenced by the latest Shin Megami Tensei: Persona games and praised it for its effect on the story and gameplay. The final part of the game was criticized for the increased difficulty with the reviewer from Gaming Age not recommending it to player who are not tolerable to these challenging fights.

The game was often compared with its predecessor, Shin Megami Tensei: Devil Survivor. Despite noting multiple similarities between Devil Survivor 2 and its predecessor, Jeremy Parish from 1UP.com noted that "Perhaps the most pleasant surprise about Devil Survivor 2 is that it doesn't feel like a massive backward step despite its predecessor's having been ported to 3DS." Amanda L. Kondolojy from Cheat Code Central mentioned "Though the structure is almost the same, there are some key differences in the story this time around" and complained about several similarities between the two games. Dale North noticed several improvements in the game claiming "I'm pleased to report that Devil Survivor 2 is more of the same, this time bringing an even better story, better characters, more demons to collect and a bunch of gameplay improvements." Bob Richardson from RPGFan criticized there was "nothing new" despite citing "Tremendous variety, lots of dialogue choices and paths, challenging gameplay."

Devil Survivor 2 sold 63,000 copies during its first week of release. By the end of the year it had sold 99,748 units in Japan. In October 2011, Atlus announced that the game reached a total of 106,000 units sold. Devil Survivor 2: Record Breaker sold 53,264 copies in its first week of release in Japan.

Notes

References

External links
 Official website
 Devil Survivor 2: Record Breaker official website

2011 video games
Atlus games
Career Soft games
Earth Star Entertainment manga
Fiction about snuff films
Devil Survivor 2
Nintendo 3DS eShop games
Nintendo 3DS games
Nintendo DS games
Nintendo Network games
Nippon Ichi Software games
Shōnen manga
Single-player video games
Video game sequels
Video games about demons
Video games developed in Japan
Video games featuring female protagonists
Video games scored by Kenji Ito
Video games set in Japan
Ghostlight games